Turtyk (Turtıq) is a rural locality (a selo) in Voyadinsky Selsoviet, Yanaulsky District, Bashkortostan, Russia. The population was 84 as of 2010. There are 3 streets.

Geography 
Turtyk is located 32 km northwest of Yanaul (the district's administrative centre) by road. Voyady is the nearest rural locality.

References 

Rural localities in Yanaulsky District